Dean Rock (born 26 February 1990) is an Irish Gaelic footballer who has been a senior member of the Dublin county team since 2013.

He has represented Dublin at all grades, Minor, Junior, U21 and Senior. He is a noted free taker and scored the winning point from a free in the 2017 All-Ireland Senior Football Championship Final. Colm O'Rourke has described Rock as "statistically the best free taker that has been to Croke Park".

Early life
Born in Ballymadun, Garristown, Rock was born into a family with a strong association with Gaelic football. His great-grandfather, grandfather and granduncle all worked as groundsmen at Croke Park, while his father, Barney Rock, is an All-Ireland medal winner with Dublin.

Playing career

Secondary school
Rock attended the Catholic University School where he played rugby union in the absence of a Gaelic football team.

Club
He simultaneously came to prominence at juvenile and underage levels with the Ballymun Kickhams club before making his debut with the senior team in 2008. Since then he has won one Leinster medal and two county senior championship medals.

Inter-county

Minor and under-21
Rock made his debut on the inter-county scene when he was selected for the Dublin minor team. After an unsuccessful tenure with the minor team, he later won an All-Ireland medal as part of the Dublin under-21 team.

Junior
Dean Rock represented Dublin at Junior level in the 2009 Leinster Junior Football Championship. Dublin were knocked out in the semi final by Louth. Dean Rock scored a total of 14 points for Dublin in his two appearances for Dublin Juniors.

Senior
Rock made his senior debut during the 2012 league when he was introduced as a substitute against Donegal in March. He made his championship debut the following year against Westmeath. Since then he has won six All-Ireland medals, beginning with his first title in 2013 and followed by five successive championships from 2015 to 2019. Rock has also won six Leinster medals and five National League medals. Rock has been awarded two All Star awards for Dublin in 2017 and 2016, when he finished the season as top scorer of the All-Ireland Senior Football Championship.

Rock only started his first league match for Dublin in 2015, after which he participated in 63 consecutive league and championship games.

He is noted for his taking Dublin's frees, while attaining hitherto unimaginable levels of accuracy. Having spent to years as a substitute in 2013 and 2014, he studied placed-ball kicking and worked kicking expert Dave Alred, as he revealed in 2017.

In the 2016 All-Ireland Senior Football Championship Final replay defeat of Mayo, Rock scored 0–9 (including seven frees).

In the 2017 All-Ireland Senior Football Championship Final defeat of Mayo, Rock scored 0–7 (including three frees), including the late winner through Lee Keegan's thrown GPS pack.

In the 2018 All-Ireland Senior Football Championship Final defeat of Tyrone, Rock also scored 0–7 (including four frees).

Rock's fifth point of the drawn 2019 All-Ireland Senior Football Championship Final (which gave Dublin a lead of 1–7 to 0–6) was his 411th point for his county in league and championship in his 88th game. Combined with his 14 Dublin goals, Rock passed Bernard Brogan the Second to become the second highest scorer ever in Dublin football. Unusually, Rock has done this mostly through points; he has the lowest goal-scoring record among the top ten (with only Charlie Redmond's 15 goals within reach) and achieved the feat while making fewer appearances than those around him in the all-time list.

Rock holds the record for the fastest goal scored in the history of All-Ireland SFC finals, after sending the ball past David Clarke directly from the throw-in of the 2020 final, breaking Kerryman Garry McMahon's record which had stood since the 1962 final.

Career statistics

Personal life
Rock is in a relationship with the Niamh McEvoy, the Dublin senior ladies' footballer. 

Following the completion of the five-in-row in 2019, Rock spent a week in New York with Ciarán Kilkenny and Paddy Andrews.

He debuted the "Dean Rock Free Taking Project" in mid-2020.

Honours
Dublin City University
Sigerson Cup (1): 2012

Ballymun Kickhams
Leinster Senior Club Football Championship (1): 2012
Dublin Senior Football Championship (1): 2012

Dublin
All-Ireland Senior Football Championship (7): 2013, 2015, 2016, 2017, 2018, 2019, 2020
Leinster Senior Football Championship (10): 2013, 2014, 2015, 2016, 2017, 2018, 2019, 2020, 2021, 2022
National Football League (5): 2013, 2014, 2015, 2016, 2018, 2021
All-Ireland Under-21 Football Championship (1): 2010
Leinster Under-21 Football Championship (2): 2009, 2010

Individual

 GAA-GPA All Stars Awards (3): 2016, 2017, 2020

References

1990 births
Living people
Ballymun Kickhams Gaelic footballers
DCU Gaelic footballers
Dublin inter-county Gaelic footballers
Gaelic football forwards
Sportspeople from Dublin (city)
Winners of seven All-Ireland medals (Gaelic football)